Anderton may refer to:

People
Anderton (surname)
The Anderton baronets of England

Places
Anderton with Marbury, Cheshire
Anderton, Cornwall
Anderton, Lancashire

Other uses
 , a US Navy minesweeper in commission from 1917 to 1919